Ayr Pass is a mountain pass in the central Baffin Mountains, Nunavut, Canada.

It is located between the central part of the Ayr Lake and the Eglinton Fiord, east of the Sam Ford Fiord.

See also
Revoir Pass

References

Arctic Cordillera
Mountain passes of Baffin Island